Juhan Parts (born 27 August 1966) is an Estonian politician who was Prime Minister of Estonia from 2003 to 2005 and Minister of Economic Affairs and Communications from 2007 to 2014. Juhan Parts is a member of Isamaa party.

Education
Born in Tallinn, Juhan Parts completed Gustav Adolf Grammar School in Tallinn (then Tallinn Secondary School No. 1). Afterwards, he studied law at the University of Tartu in Tartu, Estonia.

Early career

After completing his university education, Parts instantly joined the Ministry of Justice.  who wanted to push for reforms. As an ally of Deputy Minister Mihkel Oviir, he was appointed Auditor General in the spring of 1998. He held this office until 2002. From this virtually unimpeachable office, unique in the Estonian Constitution, he frequently criticised the government and became somewhat of a popular figure in Estonian politics.

Political career
Parts became the chairman of a new party, called Res Publica, which he was instrumental in starting. It is a largely technocratic party which can be described as an economically liberal party of young administrators. Res Publica now is a member of the right-of-centre European People's Party organisation.

Prime Minister of Estonia, 2003–2005
In the Riigikogu (Estonian parliament) elections in 2003, Parts surprisingly gained a majority among the right-of-centre parties, and as a result, he was charged to form a new government coalition and became Prime Minister of Estonia. The new government took office on 10 April 2003.

On 24 March 2005, Parts stepped down as Prime Minister after a vote of no confidence against Minister of Justice Ken-Marti Vaher had passed the Riigikogu. Vaher had established a quota system of how many civil servants had to be prosecuted every year (per county), which is seen as reminiscent of Stalinist purges by many Estonians, a measure that Parts had endorsed.

Parts' term as Prime Minister officially ended on 12 April 2005 when the Riigikogu confirmed his successor Andrus Ansip.

Minister for Economic Affairs, 2007–2014
From 2007 until 2014, Parts served as Minister for Economic Affairs and Communications in the government of Prime Minister Andrus Ansip.

Early in his tenure, Parts unveiled a plan to boost Estonia's cyber security in response to the 2007 cyberattacks targeting websites of Estonian organizations, including Estonian parliament, banks, ministries, newspapers and broadcasters. Under his leadership, the Estonian government opened talks with SAS Group about the future of Estonian Air and did not rule out taking a majority stake in the carrier. Also during his time in office, Estonia and Finland signed a 2014 agreement on building two new liquefied natural gas (LNG) terminals on either side of the Gulf of Finland and a pipeline connecting the two countries.

After calling some members of the Lithuanian government "fools" in a 2014 interview with the Wall Street Journal about the joint Rail Baltic infrastructure project, Parts found himself under heavy fire in both countries.

In the 2015 parliamentary election, Parts was re-elected to the parliament with 4,208 individual votes.

European Court of Auditors, 2017–present
In 2016, the Council of the European Union appointed Parts as member of the European Court of Auditors.

Since taking office, Parts has been leading the Court's investigations into the performance of the European Anti-Fraud Office (2019), the European Union's 2014-2020 development spending in Kenya (2020) and the use of Instrument for Pre-Accession Assistance funds in the Western Balkans (2022).

References

External links

 Union of Pro Patria and Res Publica
 Estonian Ministry of Economic Affairs and Communications

|-

|-

1966 births
Living people
Politicians from Tallinn
Prime Ministers of Estonia
Recipients of the Order of the National Coat of Arms, 2nd Class
Knights Grand Cross of the Order of Merit of the Italian Republic
University of Tartu alumni
Res Publica Party politicians
Isamaa politicians
21st-century Estonian politicians
Members of the Riigikogu, 2003–2007
Members of the Riigikogu, 2007–2011
Members of the Riigikogu, 2011–2015
Members of the Riigikogu, 2015–2019